Cory Emmerton (born June 1, 1988) is a Canadian professional ice hockey centre who is currently playing for Lausanne HC of the National League (NL). He previously played in the National Hockey League (NHL) with the Detroit Red Wings. Emmerton was drafted 41st overall by the Red Wings in the 2006 NHL Entry Draft.

Playing career
Emmerton grew up playing minor hockey for his hometown St. Thomas Travellers of the OMHA and the Elgin-Middlesex Chiefs of the Pavilion AAA league in Ontario.

Junior

Kingston Frontenacs (2004–2007)
The Kingston Frontenacs selected Emmerton with their 5th round, 89th overall pick in the 2004 OHL Priority Selection from the Elgin-Middlesex Chiefs. He made the team out of training camp, and in his rookie season, scored 17 goals and added 21 assists in 58 games, finishing 6th in team scoring.

In 2005–06, Emmerton led the Frontenacs in scoring with 90 points in 66 games, helping the team make the playoff for the first time since he joined the club. In the playoffs, Kingston was eliminated in the opening round in 6 games, with Emmerton held to two points, both goals. In the 2006 NHL Entry Draft, the Detroit Red Wings selected him in the 2nd round, 41st overall selection.

During the 2006–07 season, missing some time to injuries, he  appeared in only 40 regular season games. He finished fourth in team scoring with 66 points, as the team once again made the playoffs. Emmerton lead Kingston with five goals and seven points in five games, as Kingston was eliminated in the first round.

He returned to Kingston in 2007–08, and was named team captain, but the Frontenacs soon fell out of playoff contention, and in early December, Emmerton was traded to the Brampton Battalion for Justin Levac, Thomas Middup, 2nd and 3rd round picks in 2008, 2nd and 3rd round picks in 2009, and a 6th round pick in 2010. At the time of the trade, Emmerton was leading the Frontenacs with 31 points in 24 games.

Brampton Battalion (2007–2008)
In his first game for Brampton Battalion, Emmerton scored a goal and add two assists to help the Battalion defeat the top team in the league, the Kitchener Rangers. Shortly after his trade to Brampton, Emmerton competed for a spot on the Canadian National Junior Team, but was sent home after being diagnosed with infectious mononucleosis. Emmerton came back from his illness, and recorded 30 points in 30 games with Brampton, followed by two assists in five playoff games with the team.

Professional

Detroit Red Wings (2006–2014)
Emmerton played a couple of games with the Grand Rapids Griffins in the 2007 playoffs after the Frontenacs were eliminated from the OHL playoffs, going pointless in two games. He was signed to a three-year entry level contract with the Detroit Red Wings on June 4, 2007. After the Battalion were eliminated in the first round of the 2008 OHL playoffs, the Red Wings would once again bring Emmerton up to the Griffins, as he recorded an assist in seven regular season games with the club.

In his first full season with the Griffins in the 2008-09 season, Emmerton scored 10 goals and 35 points in 69 games.  In nine playoff games, Emmerton registered one goal.

Emmerton returned to Grand Rapids for the 2009-10. He played in 76 games, scoring 12 goals and 37 points, and finishing sixth in team scoring.  Grand Rapids failed to qualify for the Calder Cup playoffs.

In 2010-11, Emmerton appeared in 65 games with the Griffins, scoring 12 goals and 38 points, good for fifth in team scoring, however, the club failed to reach the post-season for the second straight season.

Emmerton played two games in the 2010–11 season for Detroit and finished the season with their farm team, the Grand Rapids Griffins. He played his first NHL game on Saturday, January 22, 2011, and scored his first NHL goal against Corey Crawford of the Chicago Blackhawks.

Emmerton was able to secure a steady NHL spot commencing with the 2011–12 NHL season.  In 71 games, Emmerton had six goals and 10 points, and followed that up with a goal in five playoff games.  He was named 2011-12 Detroit Red Wings Rookie of the Year by the Detroit Sports Broadcasters Association on June 6, 2012.

In 2012-13 NHL season, Emmerton appeared in all 48 games for the Red Wings in the lockout shortened season, scoring five goals and eight points.  In 13 playoff games, Emmerton was held to an assist.

Emmerton spent the majority of the 2013-14 with the Grand Rapids Griffins, scoring 16 goals and 46 points in 53 games.  In 10 playoff games, Emmerton had two goals and nine assists.  He also appeared in 18 games with the Red Wings in 2013-14, earning two assists.

Europe (2014–)
On May 23, 2014, as an impending free agent with the Red Wings, Emmerton opted to sign his first European contract, agreeing to a one-year contract for the HC Sochi inaugural season in the KHL.

Emmerton appeared in all 60 games with HC Sochi of the KHL in the 2014–15 season, scoring 17 goals and 29 points.  In four playoff games, Emmerton was held pointless.

On June 8, 2015, Emmerton signed a two-year contract with HC Ambrì-Piotta of the Swiss National League (NL). He finished his first season fourth in scoring for Ambri-Piotta, tallying 15 goals and 21 assists in 49 regular season games. He suited up for three of Ambri's six relegation games, scoring twice while missing the three games as a healthy scratch.

On June 21, 2017, Emmerton was signed to a one-year contract extension by HC Ambri-Piotta.

In October 2018, Emmerton left the KHL to join Lausanne HC on a one-year deal. In April 2019, Emmerton signed a two-year contract extension with Lausanne through the 2020–21 season. Emmerton fractured his elbow after being hit by a puck in a game against HC Fribourg-Gottéron on January 25, 2020. This required surgery, forcing him to sit out the remainder of the 2019–20 season. On February 22, 2021, Emmerton was signed to an early two-year contract extension by Lausanne through to the end of the 2022/23 season.

Career statistics

Regular season and playoffs

International

References

External links

1988 births
Living people
HC Ambrì-Piotta players
Brampton Battalion players
Canadian ice hockey centres
Canadian expatriate ice hockey players in Finland
Canadian expatriate ice hockey players in Russia
Canadian expatriate ice hockey players in Switzerland
Detroit Red Wings draft picks
Detroit Red Wings players
Grand Rapids Griffins players
Ice hockey people from Ontario
Kingston Frontenacs players
Lausanne HC players
People from St. Thomas, Ontario
SaiPa players
HC Sibir Novosibirsk players
HC Sochi players